Bosset Airport  is an airfield serving Bosset, a village in the Western province in Papua New Guinea.

Facilities 

Airlines and destinations

References

External links
 

Airports in Papua New Guinea
Western Province (Papua New Guinea)